Sessions College for Professional Design is a private for-profit online college in Tempe, Arizona. It offers associate degrees, undergraduate certificates, and vocational certificates. It is accredited by the Distance Education Accrediting Commission (DEAC) and accredited at the certificate program level by Middle States Commission on Secondary Schools.

History 
Sessions was originally founded as a start-up company in 1997, where it operated out of New York City before relocating in 2009 to Tempe, Arizona, when it expanded from a certificate-only institution to an accredited, associate degree-granting college. Sessions College now enrolls approximately 773 students in associate degree and certificate programs in subjects including graphic design, web design, digital media, illustration, advertising design, digital photography, and fine arts. In 2017, Sessions was included on Graphic Design USA’s list of Top Graphic Design Schools.

Academics 
The College is run by President Gordon Drummond and CEO Doris Granatowski. Outside of Sessions College, Drummond serves on the board of the Distance Education Accreditation Commission. Until 2015, he was also a board member of the Middle States Association Commission on Secondary Schools.

Sessions College’s 2019 student-to-faculty ratio is 8:1. The faculty is composed of working professionals in the art and design industries. Faculty use an asynchronous, project-based learning model to deliver regular, online instruction, critiques, discussions, and weekly assignments. For a number of courses, students can choose between a structured, scheduled course and a self-paced option. Throughout their courses, students receive consistent individualized feedback on their work from professors, as well as feedback from peers.

Sessions College has a partnership with Excelsior College, allowing students to apply their Sessions credits to Excelsior to pursue a bachelor’s degree in Business and Management or Technology Management in under two years.

Accreditation and memberships 
For its degree programs, Sessions College is accredited by the Distance Education Accrediting Commission. At the certificate level, it is accredited by the Middle States Commission on Secondary Schools. It is also licensed by Arizona State Board for Private Postsecondary Education.

Admission 
Sessions College’s undergraduate and vocational certificates operate on an open admissions policy; any student with a high school diploma or a GED may enroll. To apply for an Associates Degree, students must submit transcripts, work samples, a written essay, and TOEFL scores for students for whom English is a second language.  Students may begin their studies at the start of any of the school's three semesters.

References

External links 
 Official website

Educational institutions established in 1997
Private universities and colleges in Arizona
Distance education institutions based in the United States
Distance Education Accreditation Commission
Graphic design schools
1997 establishments in Arizona